Jamie Linden may refer to:

Jamie Linden (ice hockey) (born 1972), former ice hockey right winger
Jamie Linden (writer) (born 1980), American screenwriter